Katja Fain (born 31 August 2001) is a Slovenian swimmer. She represented Slovenia at the 2019 World Aquatics Championships held in Gwangju, South Korea. She competed in the women's 200 metre freestyle and women's 400 metre freestyle events. In the 200 metre event she did not advance to compete in the semi-finals and in the 400 metre event she did not advance to compete in the final. She also competed in the women's 400 metre individual medley event.

References

External links
 

2001 births
Living people
Slovenian female swimmers
Place of birth missing (living people)
Swimmers at the 2018 Mediterranean Games
Swimmers at the 2022 Mediterranean Games
Mediterranean Games competitors for Slovenia
Swimmers at the 2020 Summer Olympics
Olympic swimmers of Slovenia
21st-century Slovenian women
Mediterranean Games medalists in swimming
Mediterranean Games gold medalists for Slovenia
Mediterranean Games silver medalists for Slovenia